The 1942 Cleveland Rams season was the team's sixth year with the National Football League and seventh season in Cleveland.

Schedule

Standings

Cleveland Rams
Cleveland Rams seasons
Cleveland Rams